SF1 may refer to:

Biochemistry
 SF1 (gene), a human gene
 a type of helicase, a common protein. 
 Steroidogenic factor 1

Videogaming
 Star Fox (1993 video game), the first game in the Star Fox series
 Street Fighter (video game), the first game in the Street Fighter series
 SF-1 SNES TV, a television monitor sold by Sharp Corporation with a built-in Super NES

Other uses
 SRF 1, a Swiss television channel formerly known as 'SF 1'
 Summary File 1, a United States Census report

See also

 
 
 SF (disambiguation)
 SFI (disambiguation) 
 SFL (disambiguation) (sfl)